The West Deptford Public Schools is a comprehensive community public school district that serve students in pre-kindergarten through twelfth grade from West Deptford Township, in Gloucester County, in the U.S. state of New Jersey.

As of the 2021–22 school year, the district, comprised of five schools, had an enrollment of 2,947 students and 238.5 classroom teachers (on an FTE basis), for a student–teacher ratio of 12.4:1.

The district is classified by the New Jersey Department of Education as being in District Factor Group "DE", the fifth-highest of eight groupings. District Factor Groups organize districts statewide to allow comparison by common socioeconomic characteristics of the local districts. From lowest socioeconomic status to highest, the categories are A, B, CD, DE, FG, GH, I and J.

Schools
Schools in the district (with 2021–22 enrollment data from the National Center for Education Statistics) are:
Elementary schools
Oakview Elementary School with 423 students in grades PreK-1
Laura Sandy, Principal
Red Bank Elementary School with 308 students in grade K and 2
Jill Scheetz, Principal
Green-Fields Elementary School with 483 students in grades 3-4
Karry Corbitt, Principal
Middle school
West Deptford Middle School with 869 students in grades 5-8
Jeff Podolski, Principal
High school
West Deptford High School with 821 students in grades 9-12
Kelly A. Clark, Acting Principal

Administration
Core members of the district's administration are:
Dr. Brian C. Gismondi, Acting Superintendent
Gene Mercoli, Business Administrator / Board Secretary

Board of education
The district's board of education, comprised of nine members, sets policy and oversees the fiscal and educational operation of the district through its administration. As a Type II school district, the board's trustees are elected directly by voters to serve three-year terms of office on a staggered basis, with three seats up for election each year held (since 2012) as part of the November general election. The board appoints a superintendent to oversee the district's day-to-day operations and a business administrator to supervise the business functions of the district.

References

External links
West Deptford Public Schools

Data for the West Deptford Public Schools, National Center for Education Statistics
  

New Jersey District Factor Group DE
School districts in Gloucester County, New Jersey
West Deptford Township, New Jersey